Arjun Debnath (born 22 November 1997) is an Indian cricketer. He made his Twenty20 debut for Tripura in the 2016–17 Inter State Twenty-20 Tournament on 3 February 2017. He made his List A debut on 20 February 2021, for Tripura in the 2020–21 Vijay Hazare Trophy.

References

External links
 

1997 births
Living people
Indian cricketers
Tripura cricketers
People from Agartala